This is a list of notable shopping centres in Australia. It does not include street shopping strips such as Chapel Street, Melbourne or Oxford Street, Sydney which were prevalent in Australian cities until the 1960s.

Australian Capital Territory

 Canberra Centre, City
 Erindale Centre, Wanniassa
 Kippax Fair, Holt
 Majura Park Shopping Centre, Majura Park
 South.Point Tuggeranong, Greenway
 Westfield Belconnen, Belconnen
 Westfield Woden (formerly Woden Plaza and Woden Shopping Square), Phillip

New South Wales

Sydney City

 Broadway Shopping Centre, Sydney CBD
 Central Park Mall, Sydney CBD
 The Galeries, Sydney CBD
 Glasshouse, Sydney CBD
 Harbourside, Sydney CBD
 Market City, Sydney CBD
 MidCity, Sydney CBD
 Queen Victoria Building, Sydney CBD
 The Strand Arcade, Sydney CBD
 Westfield Sydney, Sydney CBD
 World Square, Sydney CBD
 25 Martin Place, Sydney CBD

Greater Sydney
 Ashfield Mall, Ashfield
 Bankstown Central, Bankstown
 Bass Hill Plaza, Bass Hill
 Birkenhead Point Outlet Centre, Drummoyne
 Burwood Plaza, Burwood
 Carlingford Court, Carlingford
 Castle Towers, Castle Hill
 Casula Mall, Casula
 Chatswood Chase, Chatswood
 Chatswood Interchange, Chatswood
 Chullora Marketplace, Chullora
 DFO Homebush, Homebush
 Eastgate Bondi Junction, Bondi Junction
 Hurstville Central, Hurstville
Kings Cross Centre, Potts Point
Lachlan's Square Village, Macquarie Park
 Lidcombe Shopping Centre, Lidcombe
 Macarthur Square, Campbelltown
 Macquarie Centre, Macquarie Park
Marina Square, Wentworth Point
Meriton Retail Precinct Dee Why, Dee Why
 North Rocks Shopping Centre, North Rocks
Pacific Bondi Beach, Bondi Beach
Pacific Square, Maroubra
Royal Randwick Shopping Centre, Randwick
 Rhodes Waterside, Rhodes
 Rockdale Plaza, Rockdale
 Roselands Shopping Centre, Roselands
 Rouse Hill Town Centre, Rouse Hill
 Southgate, Sylvania
 Southpoint Shopping Centre, Hillsdale
 St Ives Shopping Village, St Ives
 Strathfield Plaza, Strathfield
 Stockland Balgowlah, Balgowlah
 Stockland Baulkham Hills, Baulkham Hills
 Stockland Merrylands, Merrylands
 Stockland Wetherill Park, Prairiewood
 Top Ryde City, Ryde
 Warriewood Square, Warriewood
 Westfield Bondi Junction, Bondi Junction
 Westfield Burwood, Burwood
 Westfield Chatswood, Chatswood
 Westfield Eastgardens, Eastgardens
 Westfield Hornsby, Hornsby
 Westfield Hurstville, Hurstville
 Westfield Liverpool, Liverpool
 Westfield Miranda, Miranda
 Westfield Mount Druitt, Mount Druitt
 Westfield Parramatta, Parramatta
 Westfield Penrith, Penrith
 Westfield Warringah Mall, Brookvale
 Westpoint Blacktown, Blacktown

Hunter Region
 Charlestown Square, Charlestown
 Stockland Glendale, Glendale
 Stockland Green Hills, East Maitland
 Westfield Kotara, Kotara

Illawarra
 Dapto Mall, Dapto
 Stockland Shellharbour, Shellharbour City Centre
 Warrawong Plaza, Warrawong
 Wollongong Central, Wollongong

Central Coast
 Deepwater Plaza, Woy Woy
 Erina Fair, Erina
 Westfield Tuggerah, Tuggerah

North Coast
The North Coast refers to the Mid North Coast and the Northern Rivers regions.
 Port Central, Port Macquarie
 Toormina Gardens, Coffs Harbour
 Tweed City, Tweed Heads
 Taree Central, Taree

Regional
 Lavington Square, Lavington
Rowen's Arcade, Ulladulla
 Wagga Wagga Marketplace, Wagga Wagga

Northern Territory

Greater Darwin 
 Casuarina Square, Casuarina
 Palmerston Shopping Centre, Palmerston
 Smith Street Mall, Darwin CBD

Regional 

 Alice Plaza, Alice Springs
 Katherine Central, Katherine
Todd Mall, Alice Springs
 Yeperenye Shopping Centre, Alice Springs

Queensland

Brisbane CBD
 ANZAC Square Arcade, Brisbane central business district
 Brisbane Arcade,  Brisbane central business district 
 Broadway on the Mall,  Brisbane central business district 
 MacArthur Central,  Brisbane central business district 
 The Myer Centre,  Brisbane central business district 
 Post Office Square, Brisbane
 Queen Street Mall, Brisbane central business district
 QueensPlaza, Brisbane central business district
 Wintergarden, Brisbane central business district

Greater Brisbane
 Brookside Shopping Centre, Mitchelton
 Capalaba Park Shopping Centre, Redland Bay
 DFO Brisbane Airport, Brisbane Airport
 DFO Jindalee, Jindalee
 Indooroopilly Shopping Centre (formerly Westfield Indooroopilly), Indooroopilly
 Logan Hyperdome, Shailer Park
 McWhirters Marketplace, Fortitude Valley
 Mount Ommaney Shopping Centre, Mount Ommaney
 Riverlink Shopping Centre, North Ipswich
 Strathpine Centre (formerly Westfield Strathpine), Strathpine
 Toombul Shopping Centre (formerly Centro Toombul, formerly Westfield Toombul), Nundah
 Toowong Village, Toowong
 Westfield Carindale, Carindale
 Westfield Chermside, Chermside
 Westfield Mt Gravatt, Upper Mount Gravatt
 Westfield North Lakes, North Lakes
Centrepoint Shopping Centre, Logan Central

Gold Coast
 Australia Fair Shopping Centre, Southport
 Chevron Renaissance, Surfers Paradise
 Harbour Town Shopping Centre, Biggera Waters
 Oasis Shopping Centre, Broadbeach
 Pacific Fair, Broadbeach Waters
 Paradise Centre, Surfers Paradise
 Robina Town Centre, Robina
 The Strand at Coolangatta, Coolangatta
 Westfield Helensvale, Helensvale

Toowoomba
 Grand Central Shopping Centre, Toowoomba

Sunshine Coast
 Kawana Shoppingworld, Buddina
 Noosa Civic, Noosa
 Sunshine Plaza, Maroochydore
 Nambour Plaza, Nambour

Rockhampton
 Parkhurst Town Centre, Parkhurst
 Stockland Rockhampton, Rockhampton

Mackay
 Caneland Central, Mackay

Townsville
 Stockland Townsville, Aitkenvale

Cairns
 Cairns Central, Cairns

Regional
 Stockland, Hervey Bay
 Stockland, Bundaberg
 Stockland, Kensington
 Hinkler Central, Bundaberg

South Australia

Adelaide CBD
 Adelaide Central Market
 Hutt Street
 Rundle Mall shopping precinct including:
 Adelaide Arcade
 Adelaide Central Plaza
 City Cross Arcade
 Myer Centre

Adelaide suburbs
 Armada Arndale, Kilkenny
 Burnside Village, Glenside
 Castle Plaza, Edwardstown
 Colonnades Shopping Centre, Noarlunga Centre
 Elizabeth Shopping Centre, Elizabeth
 Harbour Town, Adelaide Airport
 Mitcham Square Shopping Centre, Torrens Park
 Port Adelaide Plaza, Port Adelaide
 Westfield Marion, Oaklands Park
 Westfield Tea Tree Plaza, Modbury
 Westfield West Lakes, West Lakes

Regional 

 Gawler Central Shopping Centre, Gawler
 Mount Gambier Central, Mount Gambier
 Murray Bridge Marketplace, Murray Bridge
 Phoenix Plaza, Gawler
 Victor Central Shopping Centre, Victor Harbor
 Westland Shopping Centre, Whyalla

Tasmania

Hobart Suburbs
 Channel Court Shopping Centre, Kingston
 Eastlands Shopping Centre, Rosny Park
Glenorchy Central, Glenorchy
Icon Complex, Hobart CBD
 Northgate Shopping Centre, Glenorchy
 Shoreline Shopping Centre, Howrah

Launceston 

 Brisbane Street Mall, Launceston

Regional

 Burnie Plaza, Burnie
Prospect Vale Marketplace, Prospect

Victoria

Melbourne CBD

 Collins Place, Collins Street
 Emporium Melbourne, Bourke Street
 Block Arcade, Collins Street
 The District Docklands, Docklands
 Galleria, Elizabeth Street
 Melbourne Central, Lonsdale Street
 Melbourne GPO, Bourke Street
 QV Village, Lonsdale Street
 Royal Arcade, Bourke Street
 St Collins Lane, Collins Street
 Southbank Promenade, Southbank
 Kmart Centre, Bourke Street

Melbourne suburbs 
 Armada Dandenong Plaza, Dandenong
 Bayside Shopping Centre, Frankston
 Box Hill Central, Box Hill
 Broadmeadows Central, Broadmeadows
 Caulfield Plaza Shopping Centre, Caulfield
 Chadstone Shopping Centre, Malvern East
 Chirnside Park Shopping Centre, Chirnside Park
 DFO Essendon, Essendon Fields
 DFO Moorabbin, Cheltenham
 DFO South Wharf, South Wharf
 DFO Unihill, Bundoora
 Eastland Shopping Centre, Ringwood
 Essendon Fields Shopping Centre, Essendon Fields
 Forest Hill Chase Shopping Centre, Forest Hill
 Greensborough Plaza, Greensborough
 Highpoint Shopping Centre, Maribyrnong
 Karingal Hub Shopping Centre, Frankston
 Malvern Central, Malvern
 Northcote Plaza, Northcote
 Northland Shopping Centre, Preston
 Parkmore Shopping Centre, Keysborough
 Pacific Epping, Epping 
 Pacific Werribee, Werribee
 Pran Central, South Yarra
 Stockland Highlands, Craigieburn
 Stockland Point Cook, Point Cook
 Sunshine Marketplace, Sunshine
 The Glen Shopping Centre, Glen Waverley
 The Jam Factory, South Yarra
 The Pines Shopping Centre, Doncaster East
 Tooronga Village, Glen Iris
 Victoria Gardens Shopping Centre, Richmond
 Watergardens Town Centre, Taylors Lakes
 Waverley Gardens Shopping Centre, Mulgrave
 Westfield Airport West, Airport West
 Westfield Doncaster, Doncaster
 Westfield Fountain Gate, Narre Warren
 Westfield Knox, Wantirna South
 Westfield Plenty Valley, South Morang
 Westfield Southland, Cheltenham
 Uni Hill Factory Outlets, Bundoora

Geelong 
 Market Square Shopping Centre, Geelong
 Waurn Ponds Shopping Centre, Waurn Ponds
 Westfield Geelong

Regional 
 Central Square, Ballarat
 Gateway Plaza, Warrnambool
 Horsham Plaza, Horsham
 Mid Valley Shopping Centre, Morwell
 Mildura Central, Mildura
 Riverside Plaza, Kialla
 Stockland Wendouree, Wendouree (Ballarat)
 Traralgon Centre Plaza, Traralgon
 Wodonga Plaza, Wodonga

Western Australia

Perth CBD
 Carillon City (formerly Carillon Arcade and City Arcade), Perth
 enex100, Perth
 Forrest Chase, Perth
 Piccadilly Arcade, Perth
 Plaza Arcade, Perth
 Raine Square, Perth
 Watertown Brand Outlet Centre, West Perth

Perth suburbs
 Armadale Shopping City, Armadale
Belmont Forum Shopping Centre, Cloverdale
 Dog Swamp Shopping Centre, Yokine
 Galleria Shopping Centre (formerly Centro Galleria and Westfield Galleria), Morley
 Karrinyup Shopping Centre, Karrinyup
 Lakeside Joondalup Shopping City, Joondalup
 Livingston Marketplace, Canning Vale
 Midland Gate, Midland
 Rockingham Centre, Rockingham
 Stockland Shopping Centre, Bull Creek
 Westfield Booragoon, Booragoon
 Westfield Carousel, Cannington
 Westfield Innaloo, Innaloo
 Westfield Whitford City, Hillarys

See also 
 List of largest shopping centres in Australia
 List of Scentre Group properties

References

External links

Australia
Shopping centres